Luis Manuel's tailless bat (Anoura luismanueli) is a species of bat in the family Phyllostomidae. It is endemic to Venezuela and the eastern slope of the Cordillera Oriental of Colombia.

References

Mammals of Venezuela
Endemic fauna of Venezuela
Anoura
Mammals described in 1994
Taxonomy articles created by Polbot
Bats of South America